Engin Alkan (born 27 July 1965) is a Turkish actor. He has served at the Istanbul City Theatres as an actor and director.

Between 1984–1989, he studied acting at the Istanbul Municipal Conservatory Theatre Department and Istanbul University State Conservatory Theatre Department. Starting from 1996, he worked as an instructor and head of theatre departments in various acting schools. He still continues acting and directing works at Istanbul City Theatres, which he has been a member of since 1985. He has also worked as a voice actor on the Turkish version of various movies and animations, Papa Smurf in The Smurfs, Samwise Gamgee in The Lord of the Rings, Puss in Boots in Shrek and Braum in League of Legends. He has continued his career by appearing in various cinema and television productions.

Theatre

As actor 
 Şark Dişçisi - Nazim Hikmet Theatre - 2016
 Şekerpare - Istanbul City Theatres - 2015
 Huysuz: Engin Alkan - Aysa Prodüksiyon Tiyatrosu - 2013
 The Cherry Orchard: Anton Chekhov - Istanbul City Theatres - 2012
 Oh, oh, Juliet: Ephraim Kishon - Istanbul City Theatres - 2010
 Avenue Q: Park Müzikhol - 2009
 İstanbul Efendisi: Musahipzade Celal - Istanbul City Theatres - 2008
 Profesör ve Hulahop: Nesrin Kazankaya - Tiyatro Pera - 2008
 Keşanlı Ali Destanı: Haldun Taner - Istanbul City Theatres - 2007
 Danton's Death: Georg Büchner - Istanbul City Theatres - 2005
 Exit the King: Eugène Ionesco - Istanbul City Theatres - 2003
 Herkes Aynı Bahçede: Anton Chekhov\ Başar Sabuncu - Istanbul City Theatres - 2001
 Peace: Aristophanes - Istanbul City Theatres - 2000
 Arslan'a Benzer: Rüstem İbrahimbeyov - Istanbul City Theatres - 2000
 Waiting for Godot: Samuel Beckett - Istanbul City Theatres - 1998
 Ayrılık: Behiç Ak - Istanbul City Theatres - 1997
 War and Peace: Leo Tolstoy\Erwin Piscator - Istanbul City Theatres
 Peynirli Yumurta: Ferenc Karinthy - Istanbul City Theatres
 Askerliğim: Neil Simon - Istanbul City Theatres
 Six Degrees of Separation: John Guare - Istanbul City Theatres
 Evita: Andrew Lloyd Webber/Tim Rice - Istanbul City Theatres
 Deli Eder İnsanı Bu Dünya: Erkan Akın - Istanbul City Theatres
 Bir Garip Oyun: Ülker Köksal - Istanbul City Theatres
 The Birds: Aristophanes - Istanbul City Theatres
 Genç Osman: Turan Oflazoğlu - Istanbul City Theatres
 Döne Döne: Claude Magnier - Istanbul City Theatres
 Ya Devlet Başa Ya Kuzgun Leşe: Orhan Asena - Istanbul City Theatres
 Uncle Vanya: Anton Chekhov - Tiyatrosu Odas
 The Birthday Party: Harold Pinter - Tiyat Odası
 Günlük Müstehcen Sırlar: P. Bloch\O. Schultze - Tiyatro Pati
 Exit the King: Eugène Ionesco - Tiyatro Odası
 Tütünün Zararları: Anton Chekhov - Tiyatro Odası
 Stalin'grattan Son Mektuplar: Engin Alkan - Tiyatro Odası
 Julius Caesar: William Shakespeare - Istanbul City Theatres
 Look Back in Anger: John Osborne - Istanbul State Conservatory
 Mikado'nun Çöpleri: Melih Cevdet Anday - Istanbul State Conservatory
 Hansel and Gretel: Vecihi Karamehmet Theatre
 Ayının Feryadı Avcıyı Yendi: Istanbul City Theatres
 Pied Piper of Hamelin: Istanbul City Theatres
 Mavi Masal: Istanbul City Theatres
 Sırık Obur Camgöz: Istanbul City Theatres
 Gölgenin Canı: Istanbul City Theatres

As director 
 Şekerpare - Istanbul City Theatres - 2015
 Huysuz: Engin Alkan - Aysa Production Theatre - 2013
 Küskün Müzikal: Engin alkan - Emek Sahnesi - 2013
 The Cherry Orchard: Anton Chekhov - Istanbul City Theatres - 2012
 Şark Dişçisi: Hagop Baronian - Istanbul City Theatres - 2011
 Generaller Savaş ve Barbekü: Boris Vian - Tiyatro Adam - 2011
 Oh, oh, Juliet: Ephraim Kishon - Istanbul City Theatres - 2010
 Alemdar: Orhan Asena - Istanbul City Theatres - 2010
 Macbeth and Hecate: William Shakespeare - Istanbul City Theatres - 2010
 İstanbul Efendisi: Musahipzade Celal - Istanbul City Theatres - 2008
 The House of Bernarda Alba: Federico García Lorca - Istanbul City Theatres - 2007
 Woman Like Me: Curzio Malaparte - 2005
 Ben Anadolu: Güngör Dilmen - Istanbul City Theatres - 2003
 Exit the King: Eugène Ionesco - Istanbul City Theatres - 2002
 Antigone: Sophocles - MSM Oyuncuları - 2001
 The Cherry Orchard: Anton Chekhov - MSM Oyuncuları - 2000
 Saltanat: Kolaj - MSM Oyuncuları - 1999
 Dönüşüm: Performans Çalışması - MSM Oyuncuları - 1998
 Çizgi: Performans Çalışması - MSM Oyuncuları
 Tebeşi Dairesi: Klabunt - MSM Oyuncuları
 Metro Canavarı: G. Gür - Istanbul City Theatres
 Küskün Kahvenin Türküsü: E. Alkan/Mc Cullers - Tiyatro Pati
 The Good Doctor: Neil Simon - Sahakyan Nunyan Cultural Association

Filmography

Film 
 Kaç Para Kaç: Reha Erdem
 Çamur: Derviş Zaim
 Bu Son Olsun: Orçun Benli
 Güz Sancısı: Tomris Giritlioğlu
 Sen Hiç Ateşböceği Gördün mü?: Andaç Haznedaroğlu

Television 
 Aşağı Yukarı Yemişliler
 Deli Saraylı
 Ayda
 Erkekler Ağlamaz
 Çeşmi Bülbül
 Tarçın Konuştu
 Sana Bayılıyorum
 Kısa Devre
 Yarım Elma
 Yedi Numara
 Uğurlu Giller
 Küçük Mutluluklar
 Baba Bana Reyting Al
 Yonca
 Ters Köşe
 Ruhumun Aynası
 Mert ile Gert
 Kardeş Çocukları
 İkimizin Sırrı
 İlk ve Son

Awards 
 2012 Theatre Magazine Awards "Director of the Year Award", Şark Dişçisi - Istanbul City Theatres - 2012
 37th İsmet Küntay Theatre Awards "Most Successful Director of the Year", Şark Dişçisi - Istanbul City Theatres - 2012
 Suna Pekuysal Theatre Awards "Most Successful Director of the Year", Şark Dişçisi - Istanbul City Theatres - 2012
 TOBAV Awards "Most Successful Director of the Year", Şark Dişçisi - Istanbul City Theatres - 2012
 16th Sadri Alışık Awards "Best Comedy Director of the Year", Generaller Savaş ve Barbekü - Tiyatro Adam - 2011
 12th Crimea Bosporskiye Agoni Theatre Festival - "Best Play Director", İstanbul Efendisi - Istanbul City Theatres - 2010
 İstek Foundation Awards - "Best Director of the Year", Kral Ölüşüyor - Istanbul City Theatres - 2003
 Selim Naşit Özcan Awards - "Best Supporting Actor", Herkes Aynı Bahçede - Istanbul City Theatres - 2002
 Nasreddin Hoca Mizah Grand Awards - 7 Numara - Dizi Film - 2001
 Atlan Erbulak Awards - "Most Successful Actor of the Year Award", Arslana Benzer - Istanbul City Theatres - 2000
 İştisan Awards - "Şaziye Moral Theatre Labor Award", Barış - Istanbul City Theatre - 2000
 Afife Theatre Awards - "Most Successful Musical or Comedy Actor of the Year", Barış - Istanbul City Theatre - 2000
 Avni Dilligil Awards - "Special Jury Award" - 1996
 Avni Dilligil Awards - "Best Actor in a Supporting Role", Savaş ve Barış - Istanbul City Theatre - 1996
 Avni Dilligil Awards - "Avni Dilligil Best Team Acting Award", Askerliğim - Istanbul City Theatre - 1995

References

External links 
 
 

1965 births
Turkish male stage actors
Turkish male television actors
Turkish male voice actors
Living people
Male actors from Istanbul